Jaén Railway Station  is a railway station serving Jaén, Spain. The station is operated by RENFE and part of Adif and high-speed rail systems.

Services 
The station is served by Renfe Media Distancia services to Madrid Chamartín and Cádiz, providing travellers with frequent connections every day.

References

Buildings and structures in Jaén, Spain
Railway stations in Andalusia